Nuvvila is a 2011 Telugu romantic comedy film written and directed by Ravi Babu. He introduced six new faces with this film in lead roles. Ajay, Havish, Yami Gautam, Vijay Deverakonda,  Prasad Barve, Sarayu, and Remya Nambeesan. The film features music by Shekar Chandra and is produced by Ramoji Rao.

Plot

A disillusioned student Anand (Ajay), a wannabe model Mahesh (Havish) and a prospective violinist Raju (Prasad Barve) have one thing in common. All three of them work at Pizza Express as a stop-gap arrangement in the pursuit of their dreams. When one pizza delivery changes hands between them, three love stories are born. Anand makes a pizza delivery to Archana (Yami Gautam), who turns out to be his neighbour and falls in love with her. Mahesh goes to break up with his girlfriend Madhavi (Sarayu) and becomes the object of love of "Shailu gay" (Haleem Khan). Raju goes for a violin audition and bumps into the hate of his life Rani (Remya Nambeesan) and life gets out of hand for him.

Love for Archana lands Anand in trouble when he learns that she was in love with a famous cricketer Vishnu (Vijay Deverakonda). Trouble compounds for him when Vishnu dies and Archana was pregnant with his child. Anand shelters Archana at the cost of being thrown out of his own home. Shailu torments Mahesh and it comes to a point that based on circumstantial evidence Mahesh's parents are convinced that their son is gay. Frustration peaks in Mahesh's life when Shailu wants to marry Mahesh and his parents give their consent. The story is further complicated by the appearance of the Shailu's former lover (Chakravarthy) who wanted to sacrifice his love and get Mahesh married to his former lover. An even stranger set of circumstances keeps leading Raju and Rani into each other. To avoid arrest and subsequent jail they are forced to marry each other only to be divorced soon. But in their brief time together they fall in love and get divorced much against their true feeling for each other.

In the end Anand and Archana are accepted as a couple by Anand's parents, Mahesh and Madhavi get back together and Raju and Rani form a formidable team and get their own TV show.

Cast
Havish as Mahesh
Ajay as Anand
 Yami Gautam as Archana
 Vijay Deverakonda as Vishnu (Credited as Vijay Sai)
 Kishore 
Sarayu as Madhavi 
Remya Nambeesan as Rani
 Sudhakara Raju
 Priyadarshini
 Lakshmi Bhargavi
 Haleem Khan
 Master Atulith as Chitti
 Radha Kumari as Anand's grandmother
 Deva as Shailu's lover
 Prasad Barve as Fidel Raju

Special appearances

 M. M. Keeravani
 Koti
 Chakri
 RP Patnaik
 Kalyani Malik

Music

Reception 
A critic from Rediff.com wrote that "The film is entertaining but the script has loopholes".

References

External links

2011 films
2010s Telugu-language films
Films directed by Ravi Babu